ESL Pro League Season 1, officially known as ESL ESEA Pro League Season 1 and shortened as EPL Season 1, was an Electronic Sports League (ESL) Counter-Strike: Global Offensive tournament. It was the first season of the ESL Pro League. The Finals took place in Cologne, Germany from July 2, 2015, to July 5, 2015. Teams from two continents, North America and Europe, competed in twelve team leagues and play against each other twice to determine the top four teams from each continent would play in the Finals.

The regular season for Europe began on May 4, 2015, with Team Dignitas beating Titan and ended on June 24, 2015, with the same two teams with the same result. North America's season began on the same date and kicked off with Luminosity Gaming defeating Method and ended with Method defeating mouseSpaz. The season officially concluded with Fnatic defeating Cloud9 in a close best of five finals, 3–1.

Format
On April 28, 2015, ESL announced a joint venture with ESEA to provide a Counter-Strike: Global Offensive league with US$1,000,000 in total prize money in 2015. ESL invited twelve teams to each league to participate in its professional league. Each team would face off against every other team twice to play in twenty-two games throughout the eight week season. The top four teams from each continent would move on to the finals in Germany and would be automatically invited to the next season. Teams that placed fifth to ninth would not qualify for the finals, but would still be invited to Season 2. Teams that placed tenth and eleventh would have to play in a relegation phase, in which those teams and teams that placed second and third in ESEA Season 19's Premier League, the league under the Pro League, would face off to qualify for two spots in next season's Pro League. The team that placed first in the Premier League would qualify for Season 2. The team that placed twelfth in the Pro League would automatically be demoted to the Premier League.

The finals consisted of eight teams, four from Europe and four from North America. The teams would be placed in two groups and play in a four team, double elimination GSL group stage. In each group, the highest seed played against the lowest seed and then the other two teams would play a best of one game. Then, the winners would play against each other to determine which team takes the top spot. The losers would fight it out to determine which team goes home. The top seed would earn an automatic berth to the semifinals. The playoffs consisted of six teams. The loser of the winners' match and the winner of the losers' match in the group stage would face off against each other in the Round of 6 in a best of three. The winners of those matches went on to face the opposite group stage winner, such that the top seed of Group A would face off against the runner-up of Group B, and vice versa. The winners of those matches would move on to the finals in a best of five series.

Teams

North America

Final standings

Europe

Finals
The finalized teams are shown below.

Broadcast Talent
Host
 Alex "Machine" Richardson
Commentators
 Anders Blume
 Jason "JKaplan" Kaplan
 Auguste "Semmler" Massonnat
 John "BLU" Mullen
 Lauren "Pansy" Scott
 Leigh "Deman" Smith
Analysts
 Jonatan "Devilwalk" Lundberg
 Joona "natu" Leppänen
 Jason "moses" O'Toole
Observers
 Janko "YNk" Paunović
 Simon "pAn" Schumacher

Group stage

Group A

Group B

Round of 6

Semifinals

Finals

References

2015 in esports
ESL Pro League